"Aid Station" is the 19th episode of the third season of M*A*S*H. It was originally broadcast on February 11, 1975.

Plot 

It's breakfast, supposedly, and everyone has something to say about the questionable food being served. Henry soon calls an officers' meeting in order to address an emergency on the front lines.  Some nearby aid stations received heavy shelling, and as a result some personnel were killed.  The 4077th must send some stand-in staff: a surgeon, a nurse, and a corpsman until replacements arrive.  Margaret immediately volunteers while the surgeons avoid eye contact. Thus, they draw sausages (instead of straws) to see who gets to go. Hawkeye is the "winner", and the lucky corpsman (chosen by a random drawing by Father Mulcahy) is Klinger.

As each prepares to leave camp, Klinger tells Radar to whom each of his dresses should go in case he doesn't make it back, Margaret gives Frank a stern warning not to touch any other nurse while she's gone, and Hawkeye and Trapper share a goodbye of their own in the Swamp, ending with a toast to the Ritz Brothers. The trio soon get a flat tire, which Margaret insists on fixing to avoid Hawkeye injuring his hands (being a surgeon), while Klinger keeps an eye out for snipers. Upon arriving at the aid station, Hawkeye gets the place organized, and Klinger patches a call in to Radar, which is cut short when exploding live shells land near the station. Back at camp, Radar signs off, looking very distressed.

The episode then parallels the chaotic life-and-death situation at the aid station with the relatively calmer atmosphere at the 4077th:

 At the 4077th, the OR is busy, even as Frank complains incessantly about the terrible working conditions - such as the pits in his orange juice. 
Meanwhile, Hawkeye scrambles to save patients as best he can with limited supplies and only alcohol as a sterilizer.

After the surgery session, Frank complains to Henry about Trapper's disrespecting him, to which Henry replies "Frank, I'm going to put it on your record - you don't work and play well with others".

At the aid station, Hawkeye relies heavily on Klinger and Margaret to give hands-on help with the patients; Margaret even has to cut into a patient while Hawkeye finishes surgery at another table. The three pull off some stress-filled teamwork. All the while, they are continuously shelled.

In the swamp, Trapper and Frank argue, just as Radar comes in wearing his changing robe and carrying his teddy bear.  Trapper offers Radar Hawkeye's bunk, and Radar settles in.  Frank is indignant that an enlisted man is sleeping in his tent.  Henry comes in next, grabs himself a glass of gin and sits down.  Trapper and Henry also get in a few jabs on Frank. Still, it is clear that everyone but Frank is worried about the three absent M*A*S*H-ers.

It's also bedtime at the aid station. Klinger is sound asleep on the ground.  Margaret and Hawkeye exchange friendly words, and after he gets up to drape a blanket over Klinger, Hawkeye lays down beside Margaret. She is obviously scared, so he moves a little closer to her and shares his blanket.

In Henry's office the next day, Radar informs Henry that Margaret, Hawkeye, and Klinger are all well, safe, and on their way back. Just outside the camp, their jeep rolls up to the camp's outskirts. Hawkeye and Klinger praise Margaret, then just before they drive into camp, Klinger replaces his combat helmet with a ladies blue lace cap. In the Swamp, Hawkeye explains that Margaret was "a trooper, above and beyond the call", much to Trapper's disbelief.  In Margaret's tent, Frank is more than a little miffed to hear that she and Hawkeye got along quite well at the aid station and that Margaret "has a headache". Klinger is upset that Radar already gave away nearly all of Klinger's dresses.

Later, in the mess tent, all the officers sit around enjoying some coffee, and Frank complains even more about their terrible conditions.  Margaret and Hawkeye's eyes meet in a moment of understanding, and the episode ends.

Trivia
 The phrase “In God We Trust” was not added to all U.S currency until September 1957.
 We get a rare view of Henry Blake's office's "fourth wall."

Memorable quotes 

HAWKEYE:  Must be rough up at the front, huh?
TRAPPER:  It is in the movies.
HAWKEYE:  There's a letter in my locker.
TRAPPER:  Ok.
HAWKEYE:  It's my will.
TRAPPER:  Right.
HAWKEYE:  I leave everything to the Benjamin Franklin Pierce Memorial Brothel.
TRAPPER:  (laughs) I'll deliver it in person.

 
MARGARET:  (sighs) We did it.
HAWKEYE:  (jokingly) My lips are sealed.
MARGARET:  (pause)  Do you suppose there are snipers out there?
HAWKEYE:  If they're good union snipers, they are.  (Shares blanket with Margaret) I want you to know that chivalry isn't dead, it's just been replaced by exhaustion.

TRAPPER:  How was the major?
HAWKEYE:  Pretty damn good.
TRAPPER:  You fink, start from the top!
HAWKEYE:  Oh, no, nothing like that.
TRAPPER:  Well, you sa—
HAWKEYE:  She worked like a trooper, above and beyond the call.  Boy, your mind is in the gutter.
TRAPPER:  I can't help it. It's attached to my body.  (both laugh)

Cast 
Alan Alda as Cpt. Hawkeye Pierce, Wayne Rogers as Cpt. Trapper John McIntyre, McLean Stevenson as Lt. Col. Henry Blake, Loretta Swit as Maj. Margaret "Hot Lips" Houlihan, Larry Linville as Maj. Frank Burns, Gary Burghoff as Cpl. Radar O'Reilly, William Christopher as Father Mulcahy, and Jamie Farr as Maxwell Klinger.

References

External links

M*A*S*H (season 3) episodes
1975 American television episodes